This article lists diplomatic missions resident in Slovakia. At present, the capital city of Bratislava hosts 45 embassies (including one embassy branch office). Several other countries have missions accredited from other capitals, mostly in Vienna, Prague and Berlin.

Embassies  
Bratislava

Gallery

Missions 
 (Taipei Representative Office, Bratislava)

Embassy Branch Offices

Consulates General / Consulates

Košice

Prešov

Stará Ľubovňa

Non-resident embassies 
Vienna:

Prague:

 

Berlin:

  

 

London:

 
 

Moscow:   

Other cities:

 (Geneva)
 (Budapest)
 (Brussels)
 (Brussels)
 (Rome)
 (Geneva)
 (New York City)
 (Belgrade)
 (San Marino)
 (Singapore)
 (Budapest)
 (Geneva)

Former embassies

See also 
 Foreign relations of Slovakia
 List of diplomatic missions of Slovakia

Notes

References

External links 
 Bratislava diplomatic list

Foreign relations of Slovakia
Diplomatic missions
Slovakia